Beach volleyball at the 2014 Asian Games was held in Incheon, South Korea from September 20 to 29, 2014. In this tournament, 18 nations played in the men's competition, and 7 nations participated in women's competition.

Schedule

Medalists

Medal table

Participating nations
A total of 84 athletes from 18 nations competed in beach volleyball at the 2014 Asian Games:

Final standing

Men

Women

References

Results

External links
AVC official page
Official website

 
2014 Asian Games events
2014
Asian Games